is a Japanese manga series written and illustrated by Tomoki Izumi. It began serialization online via Kadokawa's ComicWalker website in November 2018, with eight tankōbon volumes released so far. The manga is licensed in North America by Yen Press. An anime television series adaptation by Passione aired from October to December 2021.

Premise
High school student Miko Yotsuya has the unfortunate ability to see horrifying ghosts and spirits that haunt her and the people around her. Despite this, Miko does her best to ignore the existence of ghosts and tries to live out a normal high school life.

Characters

The protagonist of the story who suddenly became able to see ghosts without any known reason. To keep her usual daily life, she pretends not to see them, as well as making efforts to prevent her best friend Hana from seeing them.

Miko's air-headed best friend who is oblivious of Miko's current situation. She is fond of eating. However, her eating also increases her life aura, which makes ghosts more attracted to her.

Miko and Hana's schoolmate who, like Miko, is also able to see ghosts. She is very fond of a local fortune teller and is disappointed when she closes her business.

A teacher who temporarily replaces Miko and Hana's homeroom teacher after she went on parental leave. Miko suspects him as someone who abuses stray cats. It is later revealed that he takes care of cats due to an incident during his childhood, as a result of a poor relationship with his mother.
 / 

A fortune teller who ran a spiritual business that Yuria frequented often while it was open. She gives up the business after Miko visited, but is curious about Miko's abilities.

Miko's younger brother, who is determined to protect her while oblivious of Miko's current situation.

Miko and Kyōsuke's mother.

Miko and Kyōsuke's father, who died prior to the events of the story.

Media

Manga
Mieruko-chan is written and illustrated by Tomoki Izumi, and began serialization in Kadokawa's ComicWalker website on November 2, 2018. Kadokawa Shoten began publishing the series in print in April 2019 and have released eight tankōbon volumes as of October 2022. The series is licensed in English by Yen Press.

Anime
An anime television series adaptation was announced on March 18, 2021. The series is animated by Passione and directed by Yuki Ogawa, with Takahiro Majima serving as assistant director, Shintarō Matsushima serving as directing assistant, Kenta Ihara supervising and writing the series' scripts, Chikashi Kadekaru designing the characters and serving as chief animation director, and Makoto Uno designing the monsters. Kana Utatane composed the music for the series. Sora Amamiya performed the opening theme , as well as the ending theme . The series aired from October 3 to December 19, 2021 on AT-X, Tokyo MX, KBS Kyoto, SUN, and BS NTV. Funimation licensed the series outside of Asia. Muse Communication licensed the series in South and Southeast Asia.

On December 10, 2021, Funimation announced the series would receive an English dub, which premiered on December 12.

Reception
In 2019, Mieruko-chan was nominated for the 5th Next Manga Awards in the digital category and placed 10th out of 50 nominees. As of October 2022, the manga had over 2 million copies in circulation.

References

External links
  
  
 

Anime series based on manga
AT-X (TV network) original programming
Comedy anime and manga
Crunchyroll anime
Horror anime and manga
Japanese webcomics
Kadokawa Dwango franchises
Kadokawa Shoten manga
Muse Communication
Passione (company)
Seinen manga
Webcomics in print
Yen Press titles